MacKinzie Kline (born March 30, 1992 in La Jolla, California) is an American female golfer who suffers from a heart defect known as heterotaxy syndrome as a result of being born with only one ventricle. The condition causes the blood in one's body to have little oxygen.

Kline participated in her first LPGA event in 2007 at the Ginn Tribute, and became the first player in LPGA history to ride a cart during competition.   Kline, who was just 15 at the time, scored an 89 and thus will be ineligible to appear in another LPGA event until 2008.

References

External links
Bio from her website''

American female golfers
Golfers from San Diego
People with congenital heart defects
1992 births
Living people
21st-century American women